Brendan Renaud (born 21 August 1973) is an Australian footballer.

Biography
He made his debut for Sydney FC coming on in the second half against Adelaide United FC which Sydney won 3-1.  He has previously played for Blacktown City, Marconi and Parramatta Power. He signed a short-term contract with Sydney FC in 2007 to help with cover in defense due to injuries to starting players, at the time he was part of the Sydney FC Coaching and Development staff in the role of Development Officer.

Brendan scored his first goal for Sydney during the Pan-Pacific Championship against their 3/4 play-offs against Los Angeles Galaxy. After some excellent build up play, he took a shot that fired into the top right corner from around 30 yards out, The world class strike was not enough to save Sydney who went down 2-1. Renaud is rumoured to be considering or have already retired from professional football, but still works for Sydney FC as a Development officer.

External links
 Oz Football profile
 Sydney FC profile

1973 births
Living people
Australian soccer players
Marconi Stallions FC players
Parramatta Power players
Sydney FC players
Blacktown City FC players
Parramatta FC players
Australian people of French descent
Association football defenders
Association football midfielders